UFC 112: Invincible was a mixed martial arts event held by the Ultimate Fighting Championship on April 10, 2010, in Abu Dhabi, United Arab Emirates. Due to the time zone difference in Abu Dhabi, UFC 112 was shown live on pay-per-view in the United States at 1 pm ET (10 am PT), with a replay at the regular time of 10 pm ET (7 pm PT).

The event was the first held in the Middle East following the purchase of a 10 percent stake in the UFC parent company Zuffa by Abu Dhabi government-owned Flash Entertainment. It was also the first UFC event to be held outdoors in an open-air arena. The Concert Arena (at the Ferrari World theme park) was erected as a temporary venue for the event and was torn down the following week.

Background
Vitor Belfort was expected to fight Anderson Silva for the Middleweight Championship; however, Belfort injured his shoulder during training and was unable to fight at the event. It was thought that Silva would instead take on Chael Sonnen, but he was unable to take the short notice fight due to lacerations obtained in a UFC 109 bout with Nate Marquardt. Silva ended up fighting Demian Maia.

A bout between Paul Taylor and John Gunderson was cancelled on the day of the fight because of health issues that Taylor faced after cutting weight.

Results

Bonus awards
Fighters were awarded $75,000 bonuses.

Fight of the Night: Kendall Grove vs. Mark Munoz
Knockout of the Night: DaMarques Johnson
Submission of the Night: Rafael dos Anjos

References

See also
 Ultimate Fighting Championship
 List of UFC champions
 List of UFC events
 2010 in UFC

Ultimate Fighting Championship events
2010 in mixed martial arts
Mixed martial arts in the United Arab Emirates
Sport in the Emirate of Abu Dhabi
Sports competitions in Abu Dhabi
2010 in Emirati sport